Saint Paul Parish may refer to:
Saint Paul Parish, Antigua and Barbuda
Saint Paul Parish, Dominica
Saint Paul Parish, Tobago
Saint-Paul Parish, New Brunswick

Civil parishes in the Caribbean
Parish name disambiguation pages